Oscar Draguicevich II (born August 19, 1969) is an American retired soccer player who spent three seasons in Major League Soccer. He also played in the American Professional Soccer League, Continental Indoor Soccer League, National Professional Soccer League and the German third division. He was a member of the United States U-20 national team at the 1989 FIFA World Youth Championship.

Youth
Draguicevich attended the University of North Texas. In 1989, he was an unused substitute on the U.S. U-20 national team which placed fourth at the 1989 FIFA World Youth Championship. He later earned three caps with the U.S. national futsal team between 1996 and 1999. He was a member of the U.S. team which competed at the 1996 FIFA Futsal World Cup. During college, Draguicevich also served as a locker room attendant for the Dallas Sidekicks during the 1986-1987 season.

Professional
In 1990, he began his professional career with the Orlando Lions in the American Professional Soccer League. That fall, he signed with the Detroit Rockers in the National Professional Soccer League (NPSL). In 1991, he moved to Germany where he spent three seasons with Third Division SC Norderstedt. In 1994, he returned to the United States where he spent the summer playing for the Detroit Neon of the Continental Indoor Soccer League. In the fall of 1994, he signed with the Cleveland Crunch of the NPSL. On February 7, 1996, the San Jose Clash selected Draguicevich in the eleventh round (108th overall) in the 1996 MLS Inaugural Player Draft. Over three seasons, he played forty-five games for the Clash before being waived on November 2, 1998. In August 1997, he played two games on loan with the Seattle Sounders of the USISL in August 1997. After being waived by the Clash, Draguicevich returned to the Cleveland Crunch. He remained with the team through the end of the 1999-2000 season, retired on August 24, 2000. He currently works with his brother Marcelo in their company, Laser Manufacturing in their hometown of  Pfugerville, Texas.

Personal life

Oscar's son, Oscar Draguicevech III, is an American football kicker. He played college football at Incarnate Word and Washington State. He was signed by the Carolina Panthers after going undrafted in the 2021 NFL draft.

References

External links
 FIFA Player Profile

Living people
1969 births
American expatriate soccer players
American expatriate soccer players in Germany
American men's futsal players
American Professional Soccer League players
American soccer players
Bay Area Seals players
Cleveland Crunch (NPSL) players
Continental Indoor Soccer League players
Detroit Neon players
Detroit Rockers players
Association football defenders
Major League Soccer players
National Professional Soccer League (1984–2001) players
North Texas Mean Green men's soccer players
Orlando Lions players
People from Pflugerville, Texas
San Jose Earthquakes players
Seattle Sounders (1994–2008) players
Soccer players from Texas
University of North Texas alumni
A-League (1995–2004) players
United States men's under-20 international soccer players
FC Eintracht Norderstedt 03 players